Foreman-Case House, also known as the Foreman-Case-Schermerhorn House, is a historic home located at Delphi, Carroll County, Indiana, United States. It was built about 1851, and is a two-story, Greek Revival style red brick dwelling with a front gable roof. It has a two-story, hip roofed rear section, with a brick first story and frame second story.

It was listed on the National Register of Historic Places in 1990.

References

Houses on the National Register of Historic Places in Indiana
Greek Revival houses in Indiana
Houses completed in 1851
Houses in Carroll County, Indiana
National Register of Historic Places in Carroll County, Indiana
1851 establishments in Indiana